Riminucci is an Italian surname. Notable people with the surname include:

Pietro Riminucci (1875–1960), Italian Roman Catholic priest
Sandro Riminucci (born 1935), Italian basketball player

Italian-language surnames